Hua Jianmin (born January 1940) is a Chinese politician. He served as state councillor and secretary general of the State Council, president of the China National School of Administration, and vice chairman of the standing committee of the 11th National People's Congress.

Biography
Born in Shanghai, Hua Jianmin graduated from department of dynamics of Tsinghua University. He joined the Chinese Communist Party (CCP) in 1961. In 1994, he was elected to the standing committee of the CCP Shanghai committee, and was appointed vice mayor of Shanghai. He was a member of the 16th and 17th Central Committees of the Chinese Communist Party.

External links
Hua Jianmin's profile at xinhuanet.com

1940 births
Living people
People's Republic of China politicians from Shanghai
Tsinghua University alumni
Chinese Communist Party politicians from Shanghai
State councillors of China
Vice Chairpersons of the National People's Congress